Caliciales is an order of mostly lichenized fungi in the class Lecanoromycetes. It consists of two families: Caliciaceae and Physciaceae, which together contain 54 genera and more than 1200 species. The order was circumscribed by American botanist Charles Edwin Bessey in 1907.

Families and genera
, Species Fungorum (in the Catalogue of Life) accepts 2 families, 56 genera, and 910 species in the Caliciales.
Caliciaceae 
Acolium – 5 spp.
Acroscyphus – 1 sp.
Allocalicium – 1 sp.
Amandinea – 83 spp.
Australiaena – 1 sp.
Baculifera – 18 spp.
Buellia – 201 spp.
Caliciella – 1 sp.
Calicium – 36 spp.
Chrismofulvea – 3 spp.
Ciposia – 1 sp.
Cratiria – 23 spp.
Dermatiscum – 2 sp.
Dermiscellum – 1 sp.
Dimelaena – 10 spp.
Diploicia – 6 spp.
Diplotomma – 12 spp.
Dirinaria – 18 spp.
Endohyalina – 10 sp.
Fluctua – 1 sp.
Gassicurtia – 30 spp.
Hafellia – 13 spp.
Hypoflavia – 3 spp.
Monerolechia – 5 spp.
Orcularia – 3 spp.
Pseudothelomma – 2 spp.
Pyxine – 44 spp.
Redonia – 1 sp.
Santessonia – 3 sp.
Sculptolumina – 5 spp.
Sphinctrinopsis – 1 sp.
Stigmatochroma – 8 spp.
Tetramelas – 31 spp.
Texosporium – 1 sp.
Thelomma – 2 spp.
Tholurna – 1 sp.
Tylophoropsis – 1 sp.

Physciaceae Anaptychia – 5 spp.Awasthia – 1 sp.Coscinocladium – 2 spp.Culbersonia – 1 sp.Heterodermia – 49 spp.Hyperphyscia – 7 spp.Kashiwadia – 1 sp.Leucodermia – 11 spp.Mischoblastia – 3 spp.Mobergia – 1 sp.Oxnerella – 1 sp.Phaeophyscia – 22 spp.Phaeorrhiza – 1 sp.Physcia – 43 spp.Physciella – 4 spp.Physconia – 15 spp.Polyblastidium – 18 spp.Rinodina – 132 spp.Rinodinella – 3 spp.Tornabea'' – 1 sp.

References

Caliciales
Lecanoromycetes orders
Lichen orders
Taxa described in 1907